'Oio Soccer Club is a Guinea-Bissauan football club based in Farim. They play in the league amateur Guinean football, the Campeonato Nacional da Guine-Bissau.

Oio Soccer Club